The 1993 NCAA Division I men's lacrosse tournament was the 23rd annual Division I NCAA Men's Lacrosse Championship tournament. Twelve NCAA Division I college men's lacrosse teams met after having played their way through a regular season, and for some, a conference tournament.

The championship game was played at Maryland's Byrd Stadium in front of 19,965 fans,

Syracuse University defeated University of North Carolina by the score of 13–12 with Syracuse's Matt Riter scoring the game-winner with eight seconds left as the Orangemen won their fourth NCAA Division I Men's Lacrosse Championship and eighth lacrosse title overall.

UNC had beaten Syracuse earlier in the season 14-10.

Syracuse finished the season 12 and 2 in defeating the number one seed.

Tournament results 

 *  =  Overtime

Tournament boxscores

Tournament Finals

Tournament Semi-finals

Tournament Quarterfinals

Tournament First Round

All-Tournament Team

Chris Surran, Syracuse (Named the tournament's Most Outstanding Player)

See also
1993 NCAA Division I Women's Lacrosse Championship
1993 NCAA Division II Lacrosse Championship
1993 NCAA Division III Men's Lacrosse Championship

References

External links 

YouTube 1993 NCAA Men's Lacrosse National Championship

NCAA Division I Men's Lacrosse Championship
NCAA Division I Men's Lacrosse Championship
NCAA Division I Men's Lacrosse Championship
NCAA Division I Men's Lacrosse Championship